The Leagues Championship Cup, officially branded under the sponsor's name as the Foxtel Cup, was an annual Australian rules football club knockout cup competition involving clubs from the various state league competitions from around Australia. The tournament was organised by the Australian Football League (AFL), and was held annually between 2011 and 2014.

The competition was first held in 2011, featuring sixteen teams from around the country who qualified based on their finishing positions in their previous state league season. In 2011 and 2012, matches were played mostly as curtain-raisers to AFL Saturday night games, or occasionally as a stand-alone game in the same timeslot; in 2013 and 2014, matches were mostly played as stand-alone games on Tuesday nights. In both cases, matches were televised on subscription television provider and competition naming rights sponsor Foxtel; and clubs played matches on or adjacent to bye weeks in their respective state league fixtures. Total annual prize money for the competition was about $250,000, with $40,000 going to the winner.

Williamstown was the inaugural Foxtel Cup champions when it defeated Claremont by 21 points in the 2011 Grand Final. Claremont went one better the following year to become 2012 Foxtel Cup Champions defeating Werribee by 44 points. West Adelaide defeated East Fremantle by four points in the 2013 Grand Final. Williamstown won its second Foxtel Cup championship in 2014 by beating West Perth by 63 points.

Qualification
For the inaugural Foxtel Cup in 2011, the AFL invited the highest three ranked teams from the South Australian National Football League, the Victorian Football League and the West Australian Football League; the top two teams from the Queensland Australian Football League; and the top team from AFL Sydney and the Tasmanian Football League – based on those leagues' 2010 seasons. The Greater Western Sydney Giants (which was playing in the NEAFL in 2011 as preparation for entering the Australian Football League in 2012), and the Northern Territory Football Club received special invitations.

However, despite the SANFL signing on to be part of the Cup competition, its top three clubs – Central District, Norwood and Woodville-West Torrens – all rejected their invitations to compete, citing lack of prize money, sponsorship conflicts, salary cap implications, schedule concerns and removing the focus from their SANFL premiership ambitions. Eventually, the SANFL positions in the competition were taken up by West Adelaide, North Adelaide and Port Adelaide Magpies, none of whom even reached the SANFL finals in 2010. In 2013 it was announced that the SANFL's top three teams of the 2012 season, Norwood, West Adelaide and North Adelaide, had committed to play in the Foxtel Cup in 2014. At the time of the announcement midway through the 2013 SANFL season the three teams were again the top three on the SANFL premiership ladder, showing that among South Australian clubs, the Foxtel Cup was gaining recognition.

In 2013 and 2014, the scale of the competition was reduced from sixteen teams to nine or ten. In those seasons, the WAFL, SANFL and VFL each contributed two teams to the competition, who entered the competition at the quarter-final stage; and the remaining teams came from the NEAFL and TFL, who contested pre-qualifying rounds before entering the quarter finals.

The AFL announced on 1 August 2011 that public interest and television audiences well-supported the inaugural year of the Foxtel Cup and as a result the competition would continue for the next five years. However, following the heavy burden of playing mid-week games on the competing clubs, the decision was made to cease the Foxtel Cup after its fourth season, 2014.

Results

2011 Foxtel Cup

Grand Final

2012 Foxtel Cup

Grand Final

2013 Foxtel Cup

Grand Final

2014 Foxtel Cup

Grand Final

Coles Medal
The Coles Medal was awarded to the best player onfield in the Foxtel Cup Grand Final.

List of participants

Stadiums

See also
NFL Night Series and AFC Night Series, similar interstate Australian rules football club competitions which operated from 1976–1979 and from 1977–1987 respectively.

References

External links
 Official Foxtel Cup website
 Official AFL Canberra website
 AFL Northern Territory
 AFL Queensland State Site
 North East Australian Football League - official website
 South Australian National Football League – official website
 Official Sydney AFL Site
 Tasmanian Football League Website
 Victorian Football League – official website
 Western Australian Football League – official website

Australian rules interstate football
Australian rules football competitions in the Australian Capital Territory
Australian rules football competitions in New South Wales
Australian rules football competitions in the Northern Territory
Australian rules football competitions in Queensland
Australian rules football competitions in Tasmania
Australian rules football competitions in Victoria (Australia)
Australian rules football competitions in Western Australia
Defunct Australian rules football competitions in South Australia
 
Recurring sporting events established in 2011
Recurring sporting events disestablished in 2014
2011 establishments in Australia
2014 disestablishments in Australia